is a railway station in Kawaminami, Miyazaki, Japan.

Lines

Layout 
The station consists of an island platform serving two tracks at grade with a siding. The station building is a modern timber structure built in western style to resemble a mountain cabin. It houses a staffed ticket window and a waiting area. Access to the island platform is by means of a level crossing with ramps at both ends. The station is not staffed by JR Kyushu but some types of tickets are available from a kan'i itaku agent on site who staffs the ticket window.

Adjacent stations

History
In 1913, the  had opened a line from  northwards to Hirose (now closed). After the Miyazaki Prefectural Railway was nationalized on 21 September 1917, Japanese Government Railways (JGR) undertook the subsequent extension of the track as part of the then Miyazaki Main Line, reaching  by 11 September 1920. In the next phase of expansion, the track was extended to Mimitsu, which opened as the new northern terminus on 11 June 1921. Kawaminami was opened on the same day as an intermediate station on the new track. Expanding north from Mimitsu in phases and joining up with other networks, the track eventually reached  and the entire stretch from Kokura through this station to Miyakonojō was redesignated as the Nippō Main Line on 15 December 1923. With the privatization of Japanese National Railways (JNR), the successor of JGR, on 1 April 1987, the station came under the control of JR Kyushu.

Passenger statistics
In fiscal 2016, the station was used by an average of 291 passengers (boarding only) per day.

See also
List of railway stations in Japan

References

External links
Kawaminami (JR Kyushu)

Railway stations in Miyazaki Prefecture
Railway stations in Japan opened in 1921